Mento is a superhero appearing in American comic books published by DC Comics.

Mento appeared in his first live adaptation on the first season of the Doom Patrol television series for DC Universe played by Will Kemp and Dave Bielawski.

Publication history
Mento first appeared in Doom Patrol #91 (November 1964) and was created by Arnold Drake and Bruno Premiani.

Fictional character biography
Steve Dayton, the world's fifth richest man, builds a helmet to enhance his mental abilities and calls himself Mento. This is an attempt on Dayton's part to impress Elasti-Girl (a.k.a. Rita Farr) of the Doom Patrol. Although his arrogant manner annoys the male field members of the team, he is successful, and in Doom Patrol #104 (June 1966), Mento and Elasti-Girl are married. They soon adopt Beast Boy (aka Garfield Logan). After Elasti-Girl's death, Mento becomes involved in the hunt for her killers, General Zahl and Madame Rouge.

In Swamp Thing (vol. 2) #49-50 (June-July 1986), Mento is recruited by John Constantine for a small gathering of powerful beings, in order to assist in a battle taking place in Hell. The demonic forces are facing an entity that could easily overwhelm and destroy them, even with the aid of the divine forces. Using Mento to get a 'read' on the situation, John assists the battle with magical power. Despite the defeat of the entity, Sargon the Sorcerer and Zatara both burn to death and Mento is driven insane (this was before the Swamp Thing and John Constantine switched into the Vertigo continuity and the event has subsequently been referred to in several mainstream DC Universe comic books). Shortly thereafter, Dayton, now in a wheelchair, resumes his Mento identity and lashes out at Garfield Logan, blaming him for the deaths of the original Doom Patrol. He then proceeds to create his own team, the Hybrid, to challenge the Teen Titans. After multiple encounters, the members of the Hybrid defy Dayton and join the Titans in curing him. Raven cures him of his madness and he seems to discard the helmet.

Much later, Dayton hires Deathstroke the Terminator to find the Titans during the Titan Hunt. The 's plans also involved nuclear bombs placed across the country, but this is neutralized by a large gathering of superheroes, mainly current and former Teen Titans members.

One Year Later

Steve Dayton is revealed to have returned with the rest of the Doom Patrol. Though a member of the Patrol, he furiously writes novels (remarking that he intends to entitle the series My Greatest Adventure), supposedly spurred on by a creative streak created by the helmet. He also seems to have developed an addiction again to his helmet, as he claims that Rita is only in love with Mento and not Steve Dayton.

Retaining his age, though clean-shaven again, Dayton's Mento helmet is now red, and he wears a black costume with a yellow lightning bolt across it; this coloration of helmet and costume resembles his original look from the original incarnation of the Patrol.

Seeing the truth about Dr. Niles Caulder (a.k.a. the Chief), who is trying to convince Kid Devil to join the Doom Patrol by telling him that his own teammates, the Titans, will always despise him as a freak, Dayton shakes off his addiction and finally removes the helmet. Thinking clearly again for the first time in years, he takes the control of the Doom Patrol from the Chief, claiming respect for the other members of the squad, and threatening the Chief if he ever reclaimed his leading role from him.

Mento is later shown, fully in possession of his mental faculties, as an occasional helper of the Justice League, filling with his cybernetically augmented mental abilities the role once held by the late Martian Manhunter. In such a role, he diagnoses Jericho's dissociative identity disorder, spurring the League to seek professional help for him.

In Final Crisis #6, Mento (along with Miss Martian) is shown amongst a group of psychics who are trying to purge the world of the Anti-Life Equation.

In the 2010 run of Doom Patrol, Mento is revealed to have left the Patrol, despite still being in contact with Caulder. Estranged from his wife, as his marriage failed when Rita found out how Dayton routinely used his mind-reading powers on her, he is called back by Caulder to stop an alien hive mind by using Rita's enlarged form as a proxy. Upon becoming aware of this new violation, Rita decides to break every remaining tie with him, blaming Caulder too for her mistreatment.

Other versions

Teen Titans: Earth One

Steve Dayton is Garfield Logan (a.k.a. the Changeling)'s adoptive father. Even though originally only dedicated to the project, he has developed a liking to Gar, actually considering him to be his son. Terra once commented that she heard the Marines kicked him out for being "too tough".

Though not explicitly mentioned, it is implied that Steve is gay and has a relationship with his S.T.A.R. Labs colleague Richard.

Powers and abilities
Steve Dayton wears a helmet of his own invention that amplifies his own latent psychic powers. While wearing the helmet, he has the powers of telepathy, psychokinesis, intangibility, and limited mind control. The helmet has the negative side effect of increasing Dayton's paranoia and dementia. Raven is eventually able to cure him of these side effects.

In other media

Television

 Mento appears in the Teen Titans two-part episode "Homecoming", voiced by Xander Berkeley. This version is the stubborn leader of the Doom Patrol and a father figure to Beast Boy who is obsessed with stopping the Brotherhood of Evil at any cost.
 Mento appears in Young Justice: Outsiders, voiced by Scott Menville. This version is Beast Boy's legal guardian following the deaths of the Doom Patrol and Beast Boy's mother and godmother, Marie Logan and Rita Farr respectively, who exploits Beast Boy's metahuman abilities for profit despite displaying a mutual disliking towards him. After forming the Outsiders, Beast Boy is legally emancipated from Mento.
 Mento appears in the Doom Patrol episode "Doom Patrol Patrol", portrayed by Will Kemp as a young man and by Dave Bielawski as an old man. This version dated Rita Farr in 1955 and was a member of a 1950s incarnation of the Doom Patrol before they were defeated by Mr. Nobody and disbanded. As a result of the battle, Mento lost control of his powers, which Joshua Clay works to keep in check while caring for him.

Miscellaneous
Mento appears in issue #7 of Batman: The Brave and the Bold.

References

DC Comics male superheroes
Fictional businesspeople
DC Comics characters who have mental powers 
DC Comics telepaths 
DC Comics telekinetics
DC Comics metahumans
Comics characters introduced in 1964
Doom Patrol
Characters created by Arnold Drake
Fictional characters who can turn intangible 
Fictional characters with precognition 
Fictional empaths
Fictional gay males
DC Comics LGBT superheroes